Niamh McGrady (born 4 October 1982) is a film, stage and television actress from Castlewellan, County Down, Northern Ireland. She is best known for her parts as Mary-Claire Carter in Holby City and PC Danielle Ferrington in the psychological thriller The Fall.

Early life and education
Born and raised in Castlewellan, County Down, she attended Assumption Grammar School, Ballynahinch, County Down. From age 18 she trained at the Royal Welsh College of Music & Drama.

Career
After landing a role in Summer 2003 in Italy, on graduation she joined a Welsh production of Romeo and Juliet and then pantomime in Belfast, before moving to London for Northern Irish playwright Lisa McGee's production of Girls & Dolls. McGrady then featured in a production of the Shakespeare play Macbeth, starring Patrick Stewart. After a critically acclaimed run in London's West End, it then relocated to Broadway, New York City in 2008.

On return to London, she made her television début in the George Best biopic Best: His Mother's Son in 2009, but her part was eventually removed in the cutting room. Shortly afterwards she joined the cast of Holby City as a cast semi-regular, in the role of nurse Mary-Claire Carter.

After appearing in many short independent films through mainly uncredited roles, she was cast in the crime drama television series The Fall, based in Northern Ireland, alongside Gillian Anderson and Jamie Dornan. She rejoined the cast of Holby City in 2013 as a regular cast member, after which she gave-up her part-time waitressing and bar jobs. However, in early 2015, McGrady left Holby City to coincide with the departure of Jules Knight and their departure scenes aired in April 2015.

Filmography

Television

Film

Stage

References

External links
 
 
 

1983 births
Living people
People from County Down
Alumni of the Royal Welsh College of Music & Drama
Stage actresses from Northern Ireland
Television actresses from Northern Ireland
20th-century Irish actresses
21st-century Irish actresses
Shakespearean actresses from Northern Ireland